Designbox for Visual Studio is a UI design productivity tool for Microsoft Visual Studio.  It adds a new toolbox window that can associate initial property values with control items.  It then applies these initial values to the control each time that control is drag and dropped onto the Form Designer.  Designbox also includes the Design Gallery window that is used to apply pre-defined designs to existing controls.

Designbox currently supports .NET Windows Forms applications and works with all the major WinForms control suites from third-party vendors such as ComponentOne, Developer Express, Infragistics, Telerik and Syncfusion.

Features
 The Designbox Window - A toolbox that stores property/value designs for control classes.  Developers can then drag-and-drop these designs onto the WinForms Form Designer to create initialized controls.
 The Design Gallery - A Visual Studio tool window that allows developers to browse through and apply control designs.
 Design by Example - The ability to create designs from an existing control that exemplifies that design.
 WinForms to Xml Conversion - Designbox uses a custom WinForms to Xml translator that converts WinForms forms and controls to Xml.

External links
 StudioWorks Designbox website
 Community Design Galleries for third-party control suites
 A Better Way to Design and Style Applications Using ComponentOne Studio and Designbox

Integrated development environments
.NET programming tools
Microsoft Visual Studio extensions